Li Lei (born 30 May 1992) is a Chinese footballer who last played as a left-back for Grasshoppers in the Swiss Super League.

Club career
Li Lei spent his youth career at his hometown team Qingdao Hailifeng and would go on to establish himself as left midfielder before recently promoted side Nanchang Hengyuan became interested in him at the end of the 2009 league season where they would promote him to the senior side.

He made his professional football league debut at the age of seventeen on April 17, 2010 against Hangzhou Greentown, however he received a straight red card just ten minutes into his career after fouling Hangzhou player Sun Ji. Despite this setback once his suspension ended he was immediately brought back into the senior side and start the next possible game on May 9, 2010 against Shaanxi Zhongjian.
He scored his first goal for Shanghai Shenxin in a 2-0 win against Jiangsu Sainty on the 31st October 2010.

Li transferred to Henan Jianye on 16 February 2013. 

On 18 January 2015, Li made a move to fellow Chinese Super League side Beijing Guoan. He scored his first goal for Beijing on 21 April 2017 in a 1–1 home draw against Tianjin Quanjian.

On 20 December 2021, Li signed with Grasshoppers in Switzerland. On 28 February 2023, Li terminated his contract with Grasshoppers, despite only having a few more months left of his contract. In his 14 appearances, 13 in the league and one in the cup, he supplied one assist.

International career
Li made his debut for the Chinese national team in a 1–0 loss against Thailand in the 2019 China Cup.

Career statistics

Club

International

Honours
Henan Jianye
China League One: 2013

Beijing Guoan
Chinese FA Cup: 2018

References

External links

 
Player stats at Sohu.com

1992 births
Footballers from Qingdao
Living people
Chinese footballers
China international footballers
Association football defenders
Shanghai Shenxin F.C. players
Henan Songshan Longmen F.C. players
Beijing Guoan F.C. players
Grasshopper Club Zürich players
Chinese Super League players
China League One players
Chinese expatriate footballers
Expatriate footballers in Switzerland
Chinese expatriate sportspeople in Switzerland